Coquitlam Lake is a reservoir located just north of Coquitlam, British Columbia. It is one of the three main water sources for  Metro Vancouver, and part of the Coquitlam watershed. It is also a part of BC Hydro's power generation system. A tunnel directs water from the lake to nearby Buntzen Lake, and from there to a pair of power stations.

History
Construction of the tunnel between Coquitlam Lake and Buntzen Lake began in 1902 and finished in 1905, supplying water to powerhouses on Indian Arm, which supplied electricity to Vancouver.

It was built to protect the water supply to the powerhouses, and also supplied water to New Westminster. By 1906 the original dam was discovered to be leaking, and while repairs were made the leak continued through 1908, until the current dam was completed in 1914.

There is a glacier in the watershed of the reservoir, Coquitlam Glacier, which is the only glacier in Metro Vancouver. It formed during the Little Ice Age and is shrinking due to the effects of climate change. It is expected to melt by 2050.

References

External links
 Coquitlam Lake at BCGNIS

Landforms of Coquitlam
Lakes of the Lower Mainland
Reservoirs in British Columbia
New Westminster Land District